2016 Malta Open is a darts tournament, which took place in Buġibba, Malta in 2016. Umit Uygunsozlu was the defending champion.

Results

Men's Singles - Last 16

Ladies Singles

Men's Pairs

Ladies Pairs

References

2016 in darts
2016 in Maltese sport
St. Paul's Bay
Darts in Malta